Lake Byllesby Dam is a concrete gravity dam located in Randolph Township, Dakota County and Stanton Township, Goodhue County, Minnesota, just west of the city of Cannon Falls.

The -high dam was built in 1910 by H.M. Byllesby & Company to impound the Cannon River for hydroelectric power. Its nameplate capacity is 1.8 MW.  Byllesby, a former employee of both Edison and Westinghouse, formed what would become Northern States Power in 1909.

The facility is owned and operated by Dakota County.

References

External links 
 Lake Byllesby Regional Park - Dakota County
 Lake Byllesby Park - Goodhue County
 Lake Byllesby Improvement Association

Dams in Minnesota
United States local public utility dams
Buildings and structures in Dakota County, Minnesota
Buildings and structures in Goodhue County, Minnesota
Gravity dams
Hydroelectric power plants in Minnesota
Dams completed in 1910
Energy infrastructure completed in 1910